Kiyo may refer to:

Kiyohime, a character in Japanese folklore
Kiyo (software), a mobile app